Heliopsis buphthalmoides is a New World species of flowering plant in the family Asteraceae. It is the only member of its genus native to both North America and South America. It is found in Mexico (from Durango and Sinaloa south to Chiapas), all 7 countries of Central America, and western South America (Colombia, Venezuela, Perú, and Bolivia).

References

External links
Photo of herbarium specimen at Missouri Botanical Garden, collected in northeastern Peru in 1984
Reproduction of 1830 color lithograph by Jean Henri Jaume Saint-Hilaire

buphthalmoides
Flora of Mexico
Flora of Central America
Flora of South America
Plants described in 1797